Santa Maria Val Müstair is a village in the Val Müstair municipality in the district of Inn in the Swiss canton of Graubünden. In 2009 Santa Maria Val Müstair merged with Lü, Müstair, Fuldera, Tschierv and Valchava to form the municipality of Val Müstair.

History
Sta. Maria Val Müstair is first mentioned in 1167–70 as die Kapelle Sancte Mariae in Silvaplana.

Geography

Sta. Of this area, 31.9% is used for agricultural purposes, while 24.7% is forested. Of the rest of the land, 1.2% is settled (buildings or roads) and the remainder (42.1%) is non-productive (rivers, glaciers or mountains).

The village is located in the Val Müstair sub-district (now Val Müstair municipality) of the Inn district.  It is along the Umbrail pass road.  It consists of the cross-shaped village of Sta. Maria Val Müstair and the alpine settlements of Craistas, Büglios and Pütschai as well as the hamlet of Sielva which includes the hospital.  Until 1995 Sta. Maria Val Müstair was known as Santa Maria im Münstertal.

Population
Sta. Maria Val Müstair has a population of 339, of which 8.8% are foreign nationals.  Over the last 10 years the population has decreased at a rate of −14.8%.

, the gender distribution of the population was 54.2% male and 45.8% female.  The age distribution, in Sta. Maria Val Müstair is; 7 children or 4.5% of the population are between 0 and 9 years old.  6 teenagers or 3.9% are 10 to 14, and 10 teenagers or 6.5% are 15 to 19.  Of the adult population, 13 people or 8.4% of the population are between 20 and 29 years old.  15 people or 9.7% are 30 to 39, 25 people or 16.2% are 40 to 49, and 26 people or 16.9% are 50 to 59.  The senior population distribution is 27 people or 17.5% of the population are between 60 and 69 years old, 19 people or 12.3% are 70 to 79, there are 4 people or 2.6% who are 80 to 89, and there are 2 people or 1.3% who are 90 to 99.

In the 2007 federal election the most popular party was the SVP which received 43.7% of the vote.  The next three most popular parties were the SPS (23.3%), the FDP (19.6%) and the CVP (11.8%).

The entire Swiss population is generally well educated.  In Sta. Maria Val Müstair about 63.7% of the population (between age 25–64) have completed either non-mandatory upper secondary education or additional higher education (either University or a Fachhochschule).

Sta. Maria Val Müstair has an unemployment rate of 1.45%.  , there were 32 people employed in the primary economic sector and about 10 businesses involved in this sector.  49 people are employed in the secondary sector and there are 10 businesses in this sector.  192 people are employed in the tertiary sector, with 32 businesses in this sector.

The historical population is given in the following table:

Languages
Most of the population speaks Rhaeto-Romance (69.7%), with German being second most common (25.4%) and Portuguese being third ( 2.4%).  Most of the population speaks the Jauer dialect of Romansh, though even in the 19th Century there was a German-speaking minority.  In 1880 about 81% of the population spoke Romansh as their first language, in 1910 it was 63%, in 1941 it was 74% and in 1970 it had grown to 81%.

Climate
Sta. Maria in Val Müstair features a warm summer humid continental climate (Dfb) according to the Köppen climate classification. The town receives on average 95.6 days of rain per year totalling  of precipitation. This relatively low level of precipitation is primarily due to its central location inside the Alps. The wettest month is August during which time Sta. Maria receives on average  of precipitation. During this month there is precipitation for an average of 11.0 days. The wettest month is therefore nearly 5 times wetter than the driest one, making Sta. Maria one of the places with the largest seasonal precipitation variety in all of Switzerland, only behind Samedan in the neighbouring Engadin valley.

Personalities
 Dario Cologna, cross-country skier

References

Val Müstair
Former municipalities of Graubünden